Ralph Pichler (born 20 April 1954 in Thun, Bern) is a Swiss bobsledder who competed during the 1980s. He won five medals at the FIBT World Championships with two golds (Two-man: 1983, 1987), one silver (Two-man: 1986), and two bronzes (Four-man: 1986, 1987).

Pichler also finished sixth in the two-man event at the 1984 Winter Olympics in Sarajevo, alongside his partner Rico Freiermuth.

References

External links
1984 bobsleigh two-man results
Bobsleigh two-man world championship medalists since 1931
Bobsleigh four-man world championship medalists since 1930

1954 births
Living people
Bobsledders at the 1984 Winter Olympics
Swiss male bobsledders
Olympic bobsledders of Switzerland
People from Thun
Sportspeople from the canton of Bern